Selos e borboletas is the fifth album by the Portuguese music composer António Pinho Vargas. It was released in 1991.

Track listing

Personnel
 António Pinho Vargas - piano and synthesizers
 José Nogueira - alto saxophone and soprano saxophone
 Aril Andersen - double bass
 Adam Rudolph - percussion instruments
 Rui Júnior - additional percussion instruments

António Pinho Vargas albums
1991 albums